Mary Baldwin University (MBU, formerly Mary Baldwin College) is a private university in Staunton, Virginia. It was founded in 1842 as Augusta Female Seminary. Today, Mary Baldwin University is home to the Mary Baldwin College for Women, a residential women's college with a focus on liberal arts and leadership, as well as co-educational residential undergraduate programs within its University College structure. MBU also offers co-educational graduate degrees as well as undergraduate degree and certificate programs for non-traditional-aged students.

The university is the oldest institution of higher education for women in the nation affiliated with the Presbyterian Church (USA), and it is home to the only all-female corps of cadets in the world.

History
Located in Staunton, Virginia within Augusta County, the university was founded as the Augusta Female Seminary in 1842 by Rufus William Bailey. Among the first students was Mary Julia Baldwin. In 1863, Baldwin was named principal and headed the school through the Civil War, although most schools in the area had closed due to the war and economic hardship. The school was renamed Mary Baldwin Seminary in 1895 in honor of Baldwin. In 1923, the name changed to Mary Baldwin College when the school became a four-year institution. In 1963, Mary Baldwin became racially de-segregated, officially ending its policy of admitting only white women. Men were admitted as day students and graduate students starting in the mid-1970s, and the school began accepting residential male students in 2017.

When Staunton Military Academy (SMA) closed in 1976, its grounds and buildings were purchased by Mary Baldwin, expanding the campus from 19 acres to 58.5. In 1977, Mary Baldwin became the first college in Virginia to launch an adult degree program. Cynthia Haldenby Tyson was appointed as the eighth president in 1985. That same year, the Program for the Exceptionally Gifted (PEG) was established to allow academically gifted girls to earn bachelor's degrees.

The Virginia Women's Institute for Leadership was established as the only all-female cadet corps in 1995. In 2001, the university established the Shakespeare and Performance graduate program after the American Shakespeare Center opened the Blackfriars Playhouse in Staunton.

After 18 years as president, Cynthia Haldenby Tyson retired and Pamela Fox, dean of Miami University's School of Fine Arts, was named the ninth president in 2003.

In May 2015, the Board of Trustees voted unanimously to change the name of the institution to Mary Baldwin University, effective August 31, 2016, reflecting the school's range of bachelor's, master's, and doctoral programs.

Academics
Mary Baldwin University offers Bachelor of Arts, Bachelor of Science and Bachelor of Social Work degrees in more than 30 majors. Undergraduate degrees are offered through the Mary Baldwin College for Women and two co-educational programs: University College and MBU Online. The school offers graduate degrees through the College of Education (Master of Arts in Teaching, Master of Education, Master of Science in Higher Education, and Master of Science in Applied Behavior Analysis), Murphy Deming College of Health Sciences (Doctor of Occupational Therapy, Doctor of Physical Therapy, Master of Science in Physician Assistant, and RN-to-BSN), and the Shakespeare and Performance program (Master of Letters and Master of Fine Arts).

Additionally, Mary Baldwin offers fast-track degrees, bachelor's-plus-master's-degree plans, professional school preparation and certificate programs. Community service and study-abroad opportunities are supplied through the Spencer Center for Civic and Global Engagement, which opened in 2007.

Institutional partnerships
The co-educational Master of Letters and Master of Fine Arts students in the Shakespeare and Performance program is partnered with the American Shakespeare Center, allowing the students to learn and perform in the Blackfriars Playhouse located a block away from campus.

The Heifetz International Music Institute, founded by violinist Daniel Heifetz, was moved from its Wolfeboro, New Hampshire location to Mary Baldwin University in 2012. The institute accepts applicants annually from around the world and offers summer programs for classically trained musicians.

MBU has also partnered with international organizations including the Clinton Global Initiative and Women for Women International to sponsor participants in Women for Women programs and raise awareness of human trafficking around the world.

Mary Baldwin has partnerships with several women's colleges around the world including Doshisha Women's College of Liberal Arts in Japan, Sungshin Women's University in South Korea, and Lady Doak College in India.

The Virginia Women's Institute for Leadership (VWIL)
Founded in 1995 by request of the Commonwealth of Virginia, VWIL (pronounced "vee-will") is an all-female cadet corps and four-year program preparing participants for both military and civilian leadership through academics, fitness, military training, practical experiences and co-circular activities. Cadets also participate in co-educational ROTC training. Commandant of the corps of cadets is Brig. Gen. Teresa "Terry" A. H. Djuric (USAF, Retired).

Program for the Exceptionally Gifted
The Program for the Exceptionally Gifted (PEG) at Mary Baldwin University is an early entrance college program for girls who have completed 7th-10th grade and have not yet completed, or in some cases not yet started, high school. The program was founded in 1985 with a class of 11 students and now enrolls approximately 30 new students each year. Participants ("PEGs") reside in a PEG-specific dorm building named for past president Cynthia Tyson, but attend classes with traditional-age students with the exception of a mandatory, PEG specific, introductory philosophy course named "Knowing the Self" (Phil 112). PEGs typically earn a bachelor's degree in the normal four years.

Campus
The MBU main campus is located in Staunton, and its Murphy Deming College of Health Sciences is located in nearby Fishersville.

The first building on Staunton campus was the Mary Baldwin University, Main Building, built in 1844. The building now houses administrative offices and has been listed on the National Register of Historic Places (NRHP) since 1973.

Traditions
MBU celebrates several annual traditions with the surrounding community. Every autumn, Mary Baldwin University commemorates Apple Day, during which students and  faculty glean apples at a Virginia orchard.  In recent years, the collected fruit has been distributed to area food pantries. The college also has marked Founders Day each October since 1898 to honor founders Mary Julia Baldwin and Rufus William Bailey.

The "Mary Baldwin College Fight Song" is sung to the tune of "Blue and Gold." The song was used by Staunton Military Academy (SMA) until it closed in 1976. After Mary Baldwin purchased the SMA campus, the college began using the academy's athletic fields, adopted the melody of the SMA fight song in 2008, and still flies SMA flags during parades. VWIL continues to hold an annual SMA reunion weekend involving a parade, banquet, and awarding of several scholarships.

Apple Day is celebrated annually at Mary Baldwin. Classes are cancelled on one day in the fall to allow time for several service projects, including an apple gleaning, and an apple-themed carnival.

Athletics

Mary Baldwin athletic teams are the Fighting Squirrels. The university is a member of the Division III level of the National Collegiate Athletic Association (NCAA), primarily competing in the USA South Athletic Conference (USA South) since the 2007–08 academic year. The Fighting Squirrels previously competed in the Atlantic Women's Colleges Conference (AWCC) from 1995–96 to 2006–07, and in the Old Dominion Athletic Conference (ODAC) from 1984–85 to 1991–92.

Mary Baldwin competes in 13 intercollegiate varsity sports: Men's sports include baseball, basketball, cross country, soccer, tennis and track & field. Women's sports include basketball, cross country, soccer, softball, tennis, track & field and volleyball.

Mary Baldwin began to sponsor men's sports since the university became co-educational, effective in the 2019–20 school year; beginning with cross country, soccer, tennis and track & field. Later baseball was added for the 2021–22 school year. And recently, basketball was added for the 2021–22 school year.

Mascot
The original mascot of the Mary Baldwin athletics program was Gladys the Fighting Squirrel. Baldwin was introduced as the new athletics mascot in November 2019.

Notable alumni

 Cora Lily Woodard Aycock, First Lady of North Carolina
 Tallulah Bankhead, actress 
 Claudia Brind-Woody, IBM executive
 Dorie Clark, author and executive education professor
 Judith Godwin, abstract painter
 Caroline Rose Hunt, hotelier and philanthropist
 Anna Jarvis, founder of Mother's Day
 Louisa Venable Kyle, writer
 Custer LaRue, musician
 Lucille Foster McMillin, federal official
 Jason Narvy, actor
 Susan Schmidt, Pulitzer prize-winning journalist
 St. Clair Wright, historic preservationist

See also
Women's Colleges in the Southern United States

References

Further reading

External links 

 
 Official athletics website
 Campus map
 Collection of scanned archival materials from MBC library hosted at archive.org (Yearbooks, college newsletters, etc.)

 

 
Former women's universities and colleges in the United States
Private universities and colleges in Virginia
Universities and colleges accredited by the Southern Association of Colleges and Schools
Universities and colleges affiliated with the Presbyterian Church (USA)
Educational institutions established in 1842
Female seminaries in the United States
Women in Virginia
Sixth form colleges
Tourist attractions in Staunton, Virginia
1842 establishments in Virginia